Neal Alexander Scott Mackey (born 10 February 1983) is an English cricketer.  Mackey is a right-handed batsman who bowls right-arm medium-fast.  He was born in Leicester, Leicestershire.

Mackey represented the Leicestershire Cricket Board in a single List A match against the Kent Cricket Board in the 2nd round of the 2003 Cheltenham & Gloucester Trophy which was held in 2002.  In his only List A match he scored 25 runs.

In currently plays club cricket for Market Harborough Cricket Club in the Leicestershire Premier Cricket League.

References

External links
Neal Mackey at Cricinfo
Neal Mackey at CricketArchive

1983 births
Living people
Cricketers from Leicester
English cricketers
Leicestershire Cricket Board cricketers